Abraham Hooke was a wealthy slave merchant from Bristol who participated in the Transatlantic Slave Trade from 1703 to 1736.

Personal life 
Abraham Hooke was made a Warden of the Society of Merchant Ventures of Bristol in 1702, and retained the position in 1703, the year of his first slave trade. He was made the master or the head of the Society of Merchants in 1712, and was part of the group of men from this society that inherited land and property from the will of Edward Colston in 1708. Hooke was made sheriff of Bristol in 1706. In 1711, with help from Nathaniel Wade (a conspirator in the assassination attempt against King Charles II of England), Hooke helped fund a bridge in Bristol over the River Frome named "Traitors Bridge". In 1722 Hooke co-founded Stokes' Croft Endowed School, one of the oldest endowed schools in Bristol. He had at least one son named Andrew, who wrote a history of Bristol called Bristolia in 1748, had a doctorate in medicine, was a manager of a printing office in Bristol, and was part of the commission of the peace for Gloucestershire.

Family 
Hooke grew up far from impoverished. His great-grandfather, Humphrey Hooke, was the sheriff of Bristol in 1614 and mayor in 1629. Abraham's grandfather, Thomas, went on to be sheriff in 1634. The merchant's father, Sir Humphrey, was also a merchant, and was mayor in 1643. He was elected by the city along with John Knight as Burgess who represented them in Parliament in 1661, though Hooke requested Lord Ossory be placed in his stead. When Ossory was called onto the King's private council, Humphrey was placed in his elected position, and was knighted for his courtesy. Upon his death in 1677, he donated 680 British Pounds to St. Stephen Parish, where 8 shillings in bread a week was to be distributed at Queen Elizabeth's Hospital.
 Sir Humphrey is noted as having built Ashley court on Ashley down for a residence, as well as owning another mansion on Corn street and a country residence in Kingsweston which would go on to be remodeled as the Kings Weston House after being sold in 1679 to Sir Robert Southwell. It is likely that Abraham inherited at least one or all three of these locations and resided in them, though it is unlikely that they exist to this day.

Transatlantic Slave Trade

Pickups 
Abraham Hooke's ships often sailed to the Bite of Biafra which is in the Gulf of Guinea. The merchant and his company sent the ships Anna and Sarah, Rebecca and the Tiverton to the Bight of Biafra and the Gulf of Guinea Islands. Another popular place his ships traveled to was Gambia. The Gambia was one of the most popular places for merchants like Hooke to acquire their human cargo because of its geographical locale and proximity to Bristol and the New World. Shorter distances traveled aboard these sailing vessels meant fewer deaths among the slaves during the middle passage. Because of this, however, Gambian slaves were more expensive. Thus slave merchants such as Abraham Hooke were often willing to travel further along the coast of West Africa, places like the Bite of Biafra, to purchase slaves for less money.

Drop offs 
Abraham Hooke's slave ships dropped off most of his human cargo in the Caribbean, in places like Jamaica. Hooke's merchant ships dropped off slaves to feed the islands demand for labor, sugar being plantation owner's main cash crop. During that time, Jamaica was under English rule and Jamaican elites were financially bound to England. Because of the ties between Jamaica and England, Hooke, as well as other merchants, dropped off many of their slaves in Jamaica. Hooke's captains also sold slaves in Barbados to owners of the numerous sugar plantations, helping to create one of the most profitable sugar plantation systems in the world.

Personal ventures 
Hooke's own ventures in slave-trading began in 1703, when the Cowslip brought 128 African slaves to Jamaica. There was a decade hiatus before he continued to traffic humans, having regular ventures from 1713 all the way to 1729. There, there is another hiatus, ending in 1736 when the Betty Snow brought 400 slaves (the largest haul in a single voyage funded by Hooke) to be sold in Virginia. In total, Hooke would engage in the transport of 5,976 Africans to be sold into slavery over the course of 27 known voyages, 4,828 of whom would survive the Trans-Atlantic crossing. This means the fatality rate aboard his ships was 19.3%, a fair amount greater than the average of 15% during the early eighteenth century.

Oftentimes, once the ships had unloaded their human cargo, they would load up on a product in the New World to be sold in the Old. In particular, Hooke's ships transported a notable amount of redwood, with some “Guinea grains” being imported in his earlier voyages.

References

External links 
 Chamber, Douglas Murder at Montpelier
 Discovering Bristol.org, Profit and Loss
 Dresser, Madge. Slavery Obscured: The Social History of the Slave Trade in an English Provincial Port

Year of death missing
Businesspeople from Bristol
English slave traders
High Sheriffs of Bristol
British slave owners
18th-century English businesspeople
17th-century births
18th-century deaths
Year of birth missing